Lamington (historically known as Lamington Heights) is a residential suburb of Kalgoorlie-Boulder, a city in the Eastern Goldfields region of Western Australia. It had a population of 2,112 people at the 2016 census, down from 2,278 in 2011.

Lamington was one of Kalgoorlie's first suburbs. It is bounded by Killarney Street to the northwest; Butterfly Street, Lyall Street, Memorial Drive, and Parsons Street to the southwest; Hare Street to the southeast; and the railway to the northeast. The streets are laid out in a grid pattern.

References